Intlo Deyyam Nakem Bhayam is a 2016 Telugu-language horror comedy film, produced by B. V. S. N. Prasad on SVCC Sri Venkateswara Cine Chitra banner and directed by G. Nageswara Reddy. Starring Allari Naresh, Kruthika Jayakumar, Mouryani and Rajendra Prasad, with music composed by Sai Karthik.

Plot
Naresh runs a band troupe, he falls for a girl Indumati at first sight, who runs an orphanage. During the process of wooing her, he learns, that a kid in the orphanage is suffering from a serious heart problem and must be operated on soon which requires 3 lakhs. Simultaneously, another story runs, a wealthy man, Gopala Krishna purchases a farmhouse in the suburbs of the city to perform his daughter's marriage. After the registration, he identifies that the house is haunted. To solve the problem, Gopala Krishna contacts a wizard but by mistake, he dials the wrong number which Naresh receives, as he is in a financial problem, Narsh changes himself into a fake wizard, succeeds in impressing them, collects the remuneration, and saves the kid. Meanwhile, the people in the house still feel the haunting. So, Naresh arrives once again when a twist arises in the story the ghost is behind Naresh who is his cousin Swapna. Now it's time for a brief flashback where Swapna has lost her parents in childhood, brought up by Naresh and she loves him a lot. Both of them decide to make register for marriage. Unfortunately, on the way to the registered office, two men kidnapped Swapna then molested, killed, and buried her in the garden of this farmhouse. Shockingly, here Swapna keeps a condition to leave the house, she should marry Naresh. Listening to it everyone gets aghast because it has never happened in the universe. But due to her threat, Gopala Krishna makes marriage arrangements for Naresh with the ghost Swapna. Parallelly, Swapna succeeds in eliminating the two culprits who have murdered her. Frightened, Gopala Krishna and his family contact a real wizard when Swapna's real intention comes out, she wants to kill Naresh and take his soul along with her. then Naresh finally makes Swapna understand true love. After this Naresh marries Indumati and on their first night Indumati is repossessed by Swapna's spirit and Naresh exclaims that he is being haunted by Swapna

Cast
Principal cast
Allari Naresh as Naresh
Kruthika Jayakumar as Indumati
Mouryani as Swapna
Rajendra Prasad as Gopala Krishna

Supporting cast
Brahmanandam as C.I.Balaji
Jaya Prakash Reddy
Chalapathi Rao as Chalapathi 
Prabhas Sreenu as Seenu
 Shakalaka Shankar
Jabardasth Chandra
Giridhar
Ananth
Kadambari Kiran 
Amith as Amith 
Prabhakar as Wizard 
Tarzan as Karuna 
Dhanraj
Pragathi as Gopala Krishna's wife
Sana
Rajitha as Constable Mani
Meena as Indumaathi's mother
Apoorva as Saloni
Jayavani

Soundtrack

Music composed by Sai Karthik. Music released on Junglee Audio Company.

Release 
The Hindu wrote that "Most performances are loud and perfunctory. One sees Brahmanandam after long and he doesn’t disappoint. Drushyam girl Kruthika deserved better than this outing. It’s high time Allari Naresh moved beyond these templates". Sify gave the film aratinf of one-and-three-quarters out of five stars and wrote that "Intlo Deyyam Nakem Bhayam is a formulaic horror-comedy that smells of putrid sequences from start to the end. Second half of the movie tests the patience".

References

2010s Telugu-language films
2016 comedy horror films
Indian comedy horror films
Films directed by G. Nageswara Reddy
Films scored by Sai Karthik